Zimmerwald was an independent municipality in the Canton of Bern, Switzerland until 31 December 2003. It is located on a hill in the proximity of the city of Bern in the Bernese Mittelland. On 1 January 2004 Zimmerwald united with the municipality of Englisberg to form the new municipality of Wald.

On 31 December 2002 the population was 870. The coat of arms is three fir trees on three green mountain peaks with a background that ranges from silver to green.

History
 
Zimmerwald was only settled in the late phase of the Germanic colonisation of Switzerland. Between 800 and 900, Ciberni entering Southern Germany first settled on the Längenberg (Long Mountain), the hill on which Zimmerwald lies. The town is first mentioned in documents in the later Middle Ages. In 1999, Zimmerwald celebrated its 700th anniversary.

Zimmerwald is remembered in world history for the Zimmerwald Conference held in September 1915. Prominent socialists met from across Europe, among them Leon Trotsky and Vladimir Lenin. The conference was called by Robert Grimm of Bern. The international workers' movement split as a result of the conference into a social democratic and a revolutionary wing.

Sites of interest

Wind instruments museum
The collection of the Zimmerwald wind instruments museum covers some 1,000 wind instruments from all periods, as well as percussion instruments. They include rare pieces such as bull horns, old Germanic lures, serpents and flap trumpets, but also Swiss alphorns.

Zimmerwald Observatory
The Zimmerwald Observatory is the reference point for the CH1903+ Swiss coordinate system.

Prominent citizens and residents
 Gunvor Guggisberg (1974), Swiss entertainer
 Bruno Messerli (1931), geographer
 Hans Rudolf Streit (1910–1982), Swiss federal official
 Katrin Streit-Eggimann, Swiss politician
 Judith Wyder (1988), athlete

References

External links

Villages in Switzerland
Former municipalities of the canton of Bern